The 42nd International Emmy Awards took place November 24, 2014 in New York City and hosted by British comedian Matt Lucas. The award ceremony, presented by the International Academy of Television Arts and Sciences (IATAS), honors all TV programming produced and originally aired outside the United States.

Summary

Ceremony 
Nominations for the 42nd International Emmy Awards were announced on October 13, 2014, by the International Academy of Television Arts & Sciences (IATAS) at a Press Conference at Mipcom in Cannes. There are 40 nominees across 10 categories, and for the first time, the International Academy is recognizing programs from the United States with a new category added to the 2014 International Emmys competition. Disputed the awards productions who enrolled between December 2013 and February 2014.

In addition to the presentation of the International Emmys for programming and performances, the International Academy presented two special awards. Mad Men creator, Matthew Weiner received the Founders Award and Roberto Irineu Marinho, CEO & President, Grupo Globo received the Directorate Award.

Winners and nominees

References

External links 
 International Academy of Television Arts & Sciences Official website
 

International Emmy Awards ceremonies
International
International